Andonis Michaelides (Greek: Αντώνης Μιχαηλίδης; 24 July 1958 – 4 January 2011), better known as Mick Karn, was an English-Cypriot musician and songwriter who rose to fame as the bassist for the art rock/new wave band Japan. His distinctive fretless bass guitar sound and melodic playing style were a trademark of the band's sound.

Early life
Karn was born Andonis Michaelides in Nicosia on 24 July 1958. When he was three, his Greek-Cypriot parents moved with him to London, where he was raised. In his youth he began playing mouth organ at the age of seven and violin at the age of eleven, before he took up playing bassoon for the school orchestra. As a bassoon player he performed with the London Schools Symphony Orchestra in a concert in October 1972 which was broadcast by Radio 4. However, when his bassoon was stolen and his school refused to buy him a new one, he bought a bass guitar for £5 from a school friend. At school he became friends with David Sylvian and his younger brother Steve. As an escape from their south London environment they began to play music together and in June 1974 they made their first public performance.

Career

Japan

Initially with Karn as lead vocalist, they christened themselves Japan in 1974. Joined by keyboardist Richard Barbieri and guitarist Rob Dean the following year, they signed a recording contract with German disco label Hansa in 1977, with whom they recorded three studio albums and became an alternative glam rock outfit in the mould of David Bowie, T.Rex, and The New York Dolls. They switched to Virgin Records to record their subsequent albums Gentlemen Take Polaroids and Tin Drum.

As the band started to achieve commercial success with the release of Tin Drum and Ghosts, which reached the top five in 1982, tensions and personality conflicts between band members arose. Tin Drum was to be the band's final studio album. Long-simmering differences among the band members came to a head when Karn's girlfriend, photographer Yuka Fujii, moved in with Sylvian, and the individual members forged ahead with their own projects. Karn said in an interview that as tensions with their record company had abated following Japan's commercial success, band members began focusing on personal differences rather than on the common enemy.

Session work and solo projects
Karn played bass guitar and saxophone on Gary Numan's 1981 No.6 hit "She's Got Claws" and tracks on the song's parent No.3 
hit album, Dance. In November 1982, Karn released his first solo album, Titles,  just as Japan had announced their split. In 1982 Karn wrote some material with Michael Finbarr Murphy guitarist and writer for Heatwave, Alan Murphy of Level 42, and Diana Ross among others. They did some low key gigs around London during the summer of 1982, and then went their separate ways.  In 1983, he collaborated with Midge Ure on the UK top 40 single "After a Fashion", and in 1984, he formed Dalis Car with Peter Murphy. The duo released one album, The Waking Hour, in late 1984.  In 1982, he appeared on The Old Grey Whistle Test along with Angie Bowie, former wife of David Bowie.

In the 1990s he worked with artist David Torn, Andy Rinehart and a number of Japanese musicians, and formed the multinational new wave band, NiNa. Later, he worked as a solo artist.

Karn contributed to recordings by other artists, playing bass guitar on Bill Nelson's Chimera mini-LP, bass guitar and saxophone on Gary Numan's 1981 album Dance, and also played with Kate Bush and Joan Armatrading. In the 1990s he started the Medium Productions label along with Steve Jansen and Richard Barbieri, two of his fellow former Japan-members. and Debi Zornes (label management and artist co-ordination). In 2006, the MK Music imprint was established, by Karn, Debi Zornes and Mike Trenery — and beginning with 2006's Three Part Species, all releases, including the autobiography, have the MK Music logo on them.

In 2001, Karn began to work with Gota Yashiki, Vivian Hsu, Masahide Sakuma, and Masami Tsuchiya in the band The d.e.p., or doggy eels project. In 2001, he worked with Paul Wong on his "Yellow Paul Wong" release. Karn left London in 2004 to live in Cyprus with his wife and son, financially enabling himself to keep working as a musician/artist. In 2009, Karn also released his autobiography, titled Japan & Self Existence, available through his website and Lulu, which details his music career, his interests in sculpture and painting, his childhood, relationships, and family.

On 30 August 2010, Peter Murphy disclosed via video message (subsequently removed/hidden) on his personal Facebook profile that he would be reuniting with Karn for a week in London, perhaps in November, to begin writing and recording for a second Dalis Car album. Murphy also added that this would be the first time the two had seen each other since 1983. The project was cut short, however, as Karn had recently been diagnosed with cancer. After his death, five of the tracks they did record were released on 5 April 2012 as an EP entitled InGladAloneness. The tracks were mixed by Steve Jansen, mastered by Pieter Snaper in Istanbul and the artwork for the EP was created by Thomas Bak with a painting by Jarosław Kukowski.

Musical style
Karn was essentially a self-taught musician, stating, "I rely very much on my ears. If it sounds as if it's the right thing, then I'll keep it—even if it may not be." His first musical instrument was bassoon, with which he attended and passed an LSSO audition. After his bassoon was stolen from him, he purchased a bass guitar for £5. It was then he joined up with David Batt (Sylvian), who played acoustic guitar.

Karn was principally the bassist within Japan, but also played all the wind instruments, including the saxophone; on Tin Drum, he played the Chinese suona (credited as "dida") for the authentic oriental sound. Karn's use of the fretless bass guitar, a relatively unusual instrument in modern popular music, produces a distinctive sound and playing style, which makes his playing immediately recognisable.

Karn played an aluminium-neck Travis Bean bass on all Japan albums up to Gentlemen Take Polaroids. In 1981 he moved to Wal basses, purchasing two Mark I instruments, one with rare African tulipwood facings, the other a cherry solidbody. Karn recorded Japan's last studio album Tin Drum with the Wal and had continued to use these, along with a headless Klein K Bass.

Sculpture and painting
Karn was a self-taught sculptor working mainly in clay, although he explored other mediums. He held several exhibitions. He also painted in oils and experimented with using ceramic on the canvas to create a 3D effect. He was photographed in the early 1980s by Steve Jansen. Several of his paintings were used as sleeve covers for his music including, "Buoy" and "The Concrete Twin". His sculpture "Mask of Confidence", combining his hands with the arms, upper torso and face of photographer Yuka Fujii, was used as the inner sleeve cover for Kajagoogoo's Islands album. Karn, influenced by Chinese edible folk sculpture dating back thousands of years, also experimented in designing and creating edible life size portraiture, some of which were showcased at his restaurant "The Penguin Cafe". Karn said, "There was a definite change in style when I stopped using self-hardening clay in the mid '80s and began sculpting with more conventional clay. Finding it much more malleable, the pieces could be worked on a larger scale and needn't be focused, as was the case previously, on small detail." He continued to sculpt throughout his life and eventually learned to fire his own pieces.

Personal life
Karn had two diplomas in psychotherapy from a West London college, entitling him to call himself "Member of the Associated Stress Consultants, Psychotherapy, and Regression & Hypno-analysis".

Illness and death
In June 2010, Karn announced on his website that he had been diagnosed with advanced-stage cancer, though the specific type of cancer was not mentioned. Although singer Peter Murphy said during an interview that Karn was suffering terminal brain cancer, this has not been confirmed.  According to David Torn, Karn's cancer had already spread, and he was undergoing chemotherapy. The website announcement stated that Karn had been struggling financially for some time and appealed for donations to help pay for his medical care and provide financial assistance for his family. In addition, several people Karn had worked with, in particular Midge Ure, Porcupine Tree, and Masami Tsuchiya, announced concerts in support of the appeal. According to a website update dated 3 September 2010, the funds raised by the appeal enabled Karn and his family to move back to London, where Karn received treatment. However, the cancer had spread beyond the possibility of treatment, and he died at his home in London on 4 January 2011.

Discography

Albums
For albums with Japan (and Rain Tree Crow) see Japan discography.

Solo albums

Collaborative albums

Compilation albums 

 The Mick Karn Collector's Edition (CMP, 1996)
 Selected (MK, 2007)

Singles
"Sensitive" (Virgin, 1982) – UK No. 98
"After a Fashion" (1983) – with Midge Ure, UK No. 39
"Buoy" (Virgin, 1987) featuring David Sylvian, UK No. 63
"Of & About" (MK, 2006)

Written works
 Japan & Self Existence publisher: MK Music. Biography, covering his life from 1958 to 2006.

References 
 "Mick Karn: Honorable tension", Interview by Anil Prasad, Innerviews.org
 Rymer, Paul "History of Japan", Nightporter.co.uk

Footnotes

External links
 Mick Karn.net
 

1958 births
2011 deaths
Deaths from cancer in England
Cypriot emigrants to England
English rock bass guitarists
Male bass guitarists
English new wave musicians
English people of Greek Cypriot descent
Japan (band) members
People from Nicosia
People from Catford
English oboists
Rock oboists